Great Salkeld is a civil parish in the Eden District, Cumbria, England.  It contains 23 listed buildings that are recorded in the National Heritage List for England.  Of these, two are listed at Grade II*, the middle of the three grades, and the others are at Grade II, the lowest grade.  The parish contains the village of Great Salkeld and he surrounding countryside.  The listed buildings comprise houses and associated structures, farmhouses and farm buildings, a church and items in the churchyard, a folly, a war memorial, and a telephone kiosk.


Key

Buildings

Notes and references

Notes

Citations

Sources

Lists of listed buildings in Cumbria